Stewart E. Kosoy (1950 – October 4, 2015) was a pioneer in the video game business who worked in almost every capacity from making animation to being a designer, producer, developer, agent, and most recently, publisher and financier.  After holding a number of high-profile positions for some of the biggest game makers in the industry, he retired as an agent and senior partner of the Interactive Studio Management (ISM) Agency to co-found Digital Capital Corporation. He died in October, 2015.

Career
Kosoy got a job doing design consulting for NovaLogic on the game Wolfpack. He was employed by Taito as a producer. He joined Sega of America where he became Manager of Developer Relations. In 1991, while working for Sega, Kosoy produced Clutch Hitter, followed in 1992 by Disney's Ariel the Little Mermaid, Captain Planet and the Planeteers, and Toxic Crusaders. In 1993 he produced Dinosaurs for Hire and The Amazing Spider-Man vs. The Kingpin. The 1994 production of Star Trek: The Next Generation: Echoes from the Past completed his tenure at Sega.

Kosoy held the position of Executive Producer at Novalogic and established the company's UK office. Kosoy returned to California and became director of development for Warner Music Group. As vice president of product development at GT Interactive, during the time classic titles such as Doom II, Duke Nukem, Quake, and Unreal were published.

He left GT to become an executive producer for MGM Interactive, where he was the executive producer on Tiny Tank: Up Your Arsenal.

In 2002, Kosoy became an agent, where he began to find and represent talented development studios, eventually becoming a senior partner at ISM. One of his most noteworthy projects was putting together the Digital Illusions Creative Entertainment (DICE) - Electronic Arts (EA) deal for Battlefield 1942, which eventually led to the acquisition of DICE by EA for $24.5 million. At ISM he represented clients working on such titles as Die Hard Trilogy 2: Viva Las Vegas and Call of Duty 4: Modern Warfare until he retired in December 2011, relinquishing his senior partnership.

In 2012, Kosoy and Todd Tribell co-founded Digital Capital Corporation (DCC). The company raises financing for game developers  by acting as a matchmaker between investors and developers. At DCC, Kosoy takes a primary role in choosing projects to receive private equity placement.

Selected games

Further reading

External links

Stewart Kosoy profile on MobyGames
Stewart Kosoy at Find a Grave

References

1950 births
2015 deaths
American video game designers
Video game producers
People from Los Angeles